Shepherdstown is an unincorporated community in Upper Allen Township, Cumberland County, Pennsylvania, United States. It is situated just south of Mechanicsburg and is home to the Union Hotel, built in 1860 by Abraham Zook and listed on the National Register of Historic Places in 1989.

References 

Unincorporated communities in Cumberland County, Pennsylvania
Unincorporated communities in Pennsylvania